Gwittaegibong (귀때기청봉 / 귀때기靑峰) is a mountain of South Korea. It has an elevation of 1,577 metres

See also
List of mountains of Korea

References

Mountains of South Korea
One-thousanders of South Korea